Myadzel District (Miadzielski rajon) is a second-level administrative subdivision (raion) of the Minsk Region, Belarus. Its capital is the town of Myadzyel. Four of the main lakes of Belarus are situated in this district: Narach (the largest one), Svir (8th largest), Myadel (11th largest) and Myastro (15th largest).

Notable residents 
Maksim Tank (1912 – 1995), journalist, poet and translator
Dr. Vincent Žuk-Hryškievič (1903-1989), Belarusian emigre politician, President of the Rada of the Belarusian Democratic Republic between 1971 and 1982

Religion

Churches 
 

Church of Saint Andrew the Apostle, Kryvičy settlement

References

 
Districts of Minsk Region